Joseph Alphonse de Véri (16 October 1724 – 28 August 1799) was a French abbot. Son of Louis de Veri, a descendant of a noble Florentine family that had settled in the Papal States, Veri was educated at The Sorbonne in Paris, where he gained a doctorate in theology.

1724 births
1799 deaths
French abbots